Christopher Sandford (1902–1983) of Eye Manor, Herefordshire, was a book designer, proprietor of the Golden Cockerel Press, a founding director of the Folio Society, and husband of the wood engraver and pioneer Corn dolly revivalist, Lettice Sandford, née Mackintosh Rate.  During the war he organised preparations for underground resistance from Eye Manor in the event of a Nazi invasion.

Biography
He was born in Cork, Ireland, son of Professor Arthur Wellesley Sandford and Mary Carbery, the Anglo-Irish author. By her first marriage he had a half-brother in the Happy Valley set in Kenya. He married engraver Lettice Mackintosh Rate in 1929. Their son was playwright and musician, Jeremy Sandford.

References

Notes

Other sources
 "Printing for Love", Sandford, C. in Books and Printing (1963), Bennett, Paul A. (ed), World Publishing Co, Cleveland, Ohio
 A History of the Golden Cockerel Press (2002), Cave, R. and Manson, S., British Library and Oak Knoll Press
 The Mercian Maquis (2002), Lowry, B.  and Mick Wilks, M. (2002), Logaston Press
 The Last Ditch: Britain's Resistance Plans Against the Nazis (1968), Lampe, D., Cassell
 "Obituary: Christopher Sandford" in The Times, 21 March 1983

1902 births
1983 deaths
English graphic designers
People from Cork (city)